Aglaia saltatorum is a species of plant in the family Meliaceae. It is found in Fiji, Niue, the Solomon Islands, Tonga, Vanuatu, and Wallis and Futuna Islands.

It is a threatened species due to habitat loss.

References

External links

saltatorum
Flora of the Southwestern Pacific
Flora of the Solomon Islands (archipelago)
Vulnerable plants
Taxonomy articles created by Polbot